Halton—Wentworth was a federal electoral district represented in the House of Commons of Canada from 1968 to 1979. It was located in the province of Ontario. This riding was created in 1966 from parts of Halton and Wentworth ridings.

It consisted of the Town of Burlington and the Township of Nassagaweya in the County of Halton, and the Town of Burlington, the Town of Dundas and the Townships of East Flamborough and West Flamborough in the County of Wentworth.

The electoral district was abolished in 1976 when it was redistributed between Burlington, Guelph, Halton and Hamilton—Wentworth ridings.

Members of Parliament

This riding has elected the following Members of Parliament:

Election results

|}

|}

|}

See also 

 List of Canadian federal electoral districts
 Past Canadian electoral districts

External links 
Riding history from the Library of Parliament

Former federal electoral districts of Ontario